The Planachaux is a mountain of the Swiss Prealps, located south of Rossinière in the canton of Vaud. It overlooks the Lac de l'Hongrin on its south side.

References

External links
Planachaux on Hikr

Mountains of the Alps
Mountains of the canton of Vaud
Mountains of Switzerland
One-thousanders of Switzerland